Southchurch Park is a recreational park in the parish of Southchurch, Southend-on-Sea, Essex, England.

Cricket ground 
The first recorded cricket match on the ground was in 1906, when Essex County Cricket Club played their inaugural first-class match there, beating Leicestershire by five wickets. Essex played 130 first-class matches at Southchurch Park between 1906 and 2004, playing their final first-class match there against Nottinghamshire in the 2004 County Championship.

In addition, the ground has also hosted List-A matches, the first of which came in the 1977 John Player League and saw Essex play Middlesex. From 1977 to 2004, the ground held 28 List-A matches, the last of which saw Essex play Northamptonshire in the 2004 totesport League.

The ground has also held 19 Second XI fixtures between 1972 and 1996 for the Essex Second XI in the Second XI Championship and Second XI Trophy.

In local domestic cricket, the ground is the home venue of Southend-on-Sea and EMT Cricket Club.

References

External links
Southchurch Park on CricketArchive
Southchurch Park on Cricinfo

Cricket grounds in Essex
Essex County Cricket Club
Buildings and structures in Southend-on-Sea
Sports venues completed in 1906
1906 establishments in England